Juventud Aprista Peruana is the youth organization of Partido Aprista Peruano in Peru. It was founded in 1934.

External links
 Juventud Aprista Peruana site

Youth wings of social democratic parties
Youth wings of political parties in Peru